The Astor Theatre was located at 1537 Broadway, at West 45th Street in Times Square in New York City. It opened September 21, 1906, with Shakespeare's A Midsummer Night's Dream and continued to operate as a Broadway theatre until 1925. From 1925 until it closed in 1972, it was a first-run movie theater.

History 
The Astor was first managed by Lincoln A. Wagenhals and Collin Kemper, then by George M. Cohan and Sam Harris, and later by the Shubert Organization. The theater was designed by architect George W. Keister. Among the plays that debuted at the Astor were Cohan's Seven Keys to Baldpate (1913) and Why Marry? (1917) by Jesse Lynch Williams, the first winner of the Pulitzer Prize for Drama.

In 1925, Loew's Theatres bought the Astor and converted it into a movie house in order to have a Times Square "road show" showcase for first-run films from the MGM film studio.  The Big Parade (1925) was the first film shown at the Astor where it ran for a continuous 96-week engagement. Other films to make their Times Square debuts at the Astor include The Broadway Melody (1929), Grand Hotel (1932), The Great Ziegfeld (1936) and Gone With the Wind (1939) for MGM; Alfred Hitchcock's Spellbound (1945) and The Beatles in A Hard Day's Night (1964) for United Artists; and Walt Disney's 20,000 Leagues Under the Sea (1954).

It was demolished in 1982 to make way for the Marriott Marquis Hotel.

References
Notes

Bibliography

External links

Astor Theatre at Cinema Treasures

1906 establishments in New York City
Broadway (Manhattan)
Former Broadway theatres
Buildings and structures demolished in 1982
Demolished buildings and structures in Manhattan
Demolished theatres in New York City
Former theatres in Manhattan
Theater District, Manhattan
1972 disestablishments in New York (state)